In an accident on the Rampe de Laffrey on April 2, 1975, 29 pilgrims from Sully-sur-Loire in Loiret were killed when their bus lost its brakes at the bottom of the road, causing it to fly over a ravine at a speed estimated at 120 kilometers an hour; it then crashed into a garden and overturned.  The accident came on the heels of one in 1973 that killed 43, and was very similar to one that occurred along the same road in 1946, killing 18.

As a result of this crash, more careful regulation of electronic braking systems was instituted across France, as were annual inspections of heavy vehicles.

Notes and references

1975 road incidents
Road incidents in France
1975 in France
Bus incidents in France
April 1975 events in Europe
1975 disasters in France